Phacusa properta is a moth of the family Zygaenidae. It was described by Charles Swinhoe in 1890. It is found in Myanmar, northern India and the Nicobar Islands.

References

Moths described in 1890
Procridinae